Ian Elgin Macfarlane (born 5 April 1955) is a former Australian politician who was a member of the House of Representatives from 1998 to 2016, representing the Liberal Party. He served as a minister in the Howard and Abbott Governments.

Macfarlane was born in Kingaroy, Queensland, and was a farmer before entering politics. He was elected to parliament at the 1998 federal election, representing the Division of Groom. Macfarlane was appointed Minister for Small Business in January 2001. After the 2001 election, he was made Minister for Industry, Tourism and Resources, a position he held until the Howard Government's defeat at the 2007 election. Macfarlane returned to cabinet in 2013 as Minister for Industry (later Industry and Science) in the Abbott Government. He lost his position when Malcolm Turnbull became prime minister in September 2015, and retired from politics at the 2016 election. He is currently chief executive of the Queensland Resources Council.

Early life
Macfarlane was born in Kingaroy, Queensland, and was a farmer and president of the Queensland Graingrowers Association before entering politics. He acquired the nickname "Chainsaw" from ABC rural reporter Judy Kennedy due to his raspy voice. He now attributes the moniker to his ability to "cut through red tape", and it was alluded to in his 1998 election campaign through the slogan "The Right Voice for Groom".

Politics
Macfarlane was elected to the House of Representatives at the 1998 federal election, representing the Division of Groom for the Liberal Party. As a minister in the Coalition Government under John Howard he held the portfolio of Minister for Small Business from January 2001, before being promoted to the Cabinet role of Industry, Tourism and Resources in November 2001. After the defeat of the Coalition in the 2007 federal election he served in the shadow portfolios of Trade as well as Infrastructure and Water, and was the Shadow Minister for Energy and Resources.

In an interview with Four Corners on 9 November 2009, Macfarlane said that his position on global warming had changed "a bit", since he had recognised a greater importance for mankind's contribution. Acting as Climate Change Spokesman for the Coalition in 2009, he spent 5 weeks in negotiations around a Carbon Pollution Reduction Scheme with Minister for Climate Change Penny Wong, before a leadership spill deposed party leader Malcolm Turnbull and replaced him with Tony Abbott, and the policy was overturned.

With the election of the Abbott Coalition government in September 2013 he was appointed Minister for Industry.  He was later sworn in as the Minister for Industry and Science on 23 December 2014. Upon the ascension of the Turnbull Government in September 2015, he was dropped from the new ministry despite being a Turnbull supporter. On 3 December 2015, Macfarlane announced his intention to sit with the federal Nationals. He claimed that his experience representing regional interests was "second only to" retiring federal Nationals leader and fellow Queenslander Warren Truss. Although local party members overwhelmingly supported Macfarlane's decision, the Liberal National Party of Queensland executive blocked the move. LNP officials said that even with the overwhelming support of LNP members in Macfarlane's seat, "the interests of our party beyond his electorate" required that Macfarlane stay in the Liberal party room.

On 15 February 2016, Macfarlane announced he would retire from parliament and not contest the 2016 federal election.

Later career
In September 2016, it was announced that Macfarlane had been appointed chief executive of the Queensland Resources Council. Greens Senators Larissa Waters and Lee Rhiannon claimed that the appointment seemed to breach the current statement of ministerial standards, which requires that ex-ministers not engage in lobbying for an eighteen-month period after ceasing to be a minister. Macfarlane is also chairman of the Innovative Manufacturing Cooperative Research Centre, a position he has held since May 2016.

Despite retaining his position as Chief Executive of the Queensland Resources Council, in which he lobbies  on behalf of some of Australia’s largest carbon emitters, in late 2021 the Morrison government appointed Macfarlane to the board of the CSIRO, Australia’s lead science agency.

References

|-
 
 

 

1955 births
Living people
Abbott Government
Australian people of Scottish descent
Government ministers of Australia
Liberal National Party of Queensland members of the Parliament of Australia
Liberal Party of Australia members of the Parliament of Australia
Members of the Cabinet of Australia
Members of the Australian House of Representatives
Members of the Australian House of Representatives for Groom
People from Kingaroy
People from Toowoomba
21st-century Australian politicians
20th-century Australian politicians